KVNV (89.1 FM) is a non-commercial radio station near Reno, Nevada. It broadcasts a news/talk format with programming from Nevada Public Radio and National Public Radio.

KVNV began broadcasting under the callsign KXNV, branded as Radio Free Reno and was owned by Open Sky Media. In 2015 its callsign was changed to KJIV and it was rebranded as The Fine 89. KVNV was acquired by Nevada Public Radio for $550,000 in November 2016; the purchase was consummated on February 17, 2017. The Fine 89 changed their branding to JiveRadio and continues to operate online with content aimed for the Reno area.

Subsequently broadcasting an adult album alternative format under the branding "NV-89", KVNV flipped to a full simulcast of KNPR on September 6, 2019. The change was necessitated due to funding shortfalls at Nevada Public Radio that forced the organization to lay off its Reno-based staffers. This was intended as a temporary measure until it could find a buyer for KVNV. KSGU in St. George, Utah was also put up for sale. While it was able to find a buyer for KSGU, it has been unable to do so for KVNV.

Simulcasting stations
Programming from KVNV has one direct translator, located in Carson City. Until 2019, it was also simulcast on the second HD Radio channels of Nevada Public Radio's other stations.

References

External links
 

NPR member stations
Radio stations established in 2014
VNV
2014 establishments in Nevada
News and talk radio stations in the United States